Foster Creek may refer to:

Foster Creek (Missouri), a stream in Missouri
Foster Creek (James River), a stream in South Dakota
Foster Creek (Stanley County, South Dakota), a stream in South Dakota